Errahma is a Salafi Islamist political party in Tunisia. The party, founded in 2012, is led by Saïd Jaziri, former spokesperson for the Tunisian community in Canada.

The party supports the parliamentary system and the inclusion of Islamic law in the Constitution.

The party ran in the 2014 and 2019 parliamentary elections, in the latter of which they won four seats.

Election results

Elected representatives 
In the 2019 elections, the party gained four seats in the Assembly of People's Representatives.

 Salwa Ben Aycha, elected in Tunis' first district
 Ahmed Ben Ayed, elected for Ariana district (until January 21, 2020) 
 Saïd Jaziri, elected in Ben Arous district
 Mouadh Ben Dhiaf, elected in Manouba district (until January 21, 2020).

On January 21, 2020, MPs Mouadh Ben Dhiaf and Ahmed Ben Ayed resigned from the party, accusing leader Said Jaziri of authoritarianism.

References 

Political parties established in 2012
Political parties in Tunisia
Far-right politics in Africa
Islamic political parties in Tunisia
Salafi groups
2012 establishments in Tunisia